Sarina Roberti (April 18, 1963 in Ghent) is a Belgian rhythmic gymnast.

Roberti competed for Belgium in the rhythmic gymnastics individual all-around competition at the 1984 Summer Olympics in Los Angeles. There she tied for 24th place in the preliminary (qualification) round and did not advance to the final.

References

External links 
 Sarina Roberti at Sports-Reference.com

1963 births
Living people
Belgian rhythmic gymnasts
Gymnasts at the 1984 Summer Olympics
Olympic gymnasts of Belgium
Sportspeople from Ghent